Reina Nacional de Belleza Miss República Dominicana 2005 was held on February 2, 2004. 18 candidates representing provinces and municipalities entered. The winner would represent the Dominican Republic at Miss International 2005. The first runner up represented the country in Miss Tourism Queen International 2005. The second runner up represented the country in Reina Nacional del Café. The rest of finalist entered different pageants.

Results

Special awards

 Miss Photogenic (voted by press reporters) - Yudith Morales (Puerto Plata)
 Miss Congeniality (voted by Miss Dominican Republic contestants) - Sairy Ruiz (Com. Dom. NY)
 Best Provincial Costume - Esmeralda Paulino (Azua)

Delegates

Azua - Esmeralda Paulino
Barahona - Melisa Rodríguez
Com. Dom. Nueva York - Sairy Ruiz
Com. Dom. Pto. Rico - Melba Hidalgo
Distrito Nacional - Alexandra Nastcke
Espaillat - Yadira Rossina Geara Cury
La Altagracia - Anylis Cañizares Hernández
La Romana - Patrizia Karina Gagg Jiménez
La Vega - Yajhaira Duran
Monseñor Nouel - Digna Llaverias
Monte Cristi - Dallas Iluminada Leclerc Paulino
Puerto Plata - Yudith Morales
Samaná - Dayana Pichardo
San Juan - Heisseell Valdez
San Pedro de Macorís - Elvia Castillo
Santiago - Yoslyn Taveras Cabrera
Santiago Rodríguez - Nadia Ferreira
Valverde - Yobanka Campos

Trivia

Yadira Geara, Anylis Cañizares and Yoslyn Taveras entered in Miss Dominican Republic Universe 2004.
Patrizia Gagg entered in Miss Mundo Dominicana 2004

External links
Pageant Photo

Miss Dominican Republic
2005 beauty pageants
2005 in the Dominican Republic